Vladimir Djambazov (born Sevlievo, Bulgaria, 28 October 1954) is a Bulgarian composer and horn player.

Education
He first studied at the Music academy in Sofia under Professor Karel Stari (1976–78). He then won a DAAD scholarship and graduated from the Folkwang Hochschule in Essen, Germany, having studied electronic music composition with Dirk Reith (ICEM) and horn with Hermann Baumann. He later specialized in electronic music at ICEM, Essen, Germany.

Career

Djambazov composes in many genres and styles – from electro-acoustic and acousmatic to solo, chamber and symphonic music, jazz, music for the stage, for animated and feature films and new media.

He participated in many festivals as the Synthese (France), Elektronischer Fühling, Wien Modern and Elektrokomplex (Austria), November Music (Germany/Belgium/Netherlands), BIMESP (2000,2002/Brazil), Musica Scienza (2003/Italy), FEMF (2002, 2003/U.S.A), the ISCM World New Music Days (2002/Hong Kong, 2003/Slovenia), the SICMF (2007/Korea), Musica Viva (2008/Portugal) and NYCEMF (2009/U.S.A.) . 

His music has been aired and performed by many European and Asian broadcast companies. Labels such Monopol, Cybele , RZ Edition  and Erdenklang published his music on CD and DVD.

In 2005 he was artist-in-residence of the Berlin artistic program of DAAD, Germany . In 2009 he was one of the 13 European composers selected to participate in the NYCEMF in Manhattan, NY, USA.
Since 2009 Vladimir is co-hosting the radio show "Viva La Musica" of the Bulgarian National Radio , one of the TOP 5 music radio shows in Europe for 2011  and holder of the highest Bulgarian radio award "Sirak Skitnik" . 

Vladimir won twice in а row the Grand Prix of the International composing competition "7/8" of the St. George Foundation, USA: in 2012 (Jazz in 7/8) with "KÁRIA" for Clarinet, Trumpet/Fluegelhorn and Symphony Orchestra  and in 2013 (Rhapsody in 7/8) with "Footsteps"- a Bulgarian Dance Rhapsody for symphony orchestra . In 2014 he composed Un Viaggio in Italia, a choral-symphonic work with solo soprano.

Vladimir Djambazov has taught on Audio design and Stage music at the Sofia University.

Mr. Djambazov is honored to be Secretary General of the Union of Bulgarian composers (Since 2014).

References

External links
Union of Bulgarian composers:
German publisher of Vladimir Djambazov 

Bulgarian composers
Electroacoustic music composers
1954 births
Living people
People from Sevlievo
Folkwang University of the Arts alumni